Tan Xue (born January 30, 1984, in Tianjin) is a female Chinese fencer who won silver medals in the Sabre Individual at the 2004 Summer Olympics and in the Team Sabre at the 2008 Summer Olympics.

She became world champion in 2002, defeating the former double world champion Yelena Jemayeva in the final, and won silver medals in both Individual and Team Sabre at the 2003 World Championship. She won the Fencing World Cup in the 2001–02 and the 2006–07 seasons.

She married fencer Wang Jingzhi in 2009.

References

External links
 Profile on the Chinese Olympic Committee

1984 births
Living people
Chinese sabre fencers
Chinese female fencers
Fencers at the 2004 Summer Olympics
Fencers at the 2008 Summer Olympics
Olympic fencers of China
Olympic silver medalists for China
Fencers from Tianjin
Olympic medalists in fencing
Asian Games medalists in fencing
Medalists at the 2008 Summer Olympics
Medalists at the 2004 Summer Olympics
Fencers at the 2002 Asian Games
Fencers at the 2006 Asian Games
Fencers at the 2010 Asian Games
Asian Games gold medalists for China
Asian Games bronze medalists for China
Medalists at the 2002 Asian Games
Medalists at the 2006 Asian Games
Medalists at the 2010 Asian Games
Universiade medalists in fencing
Universiade gold medalists for China
Medalists at the 2003 Summer Universiade
Medalists at the 2009 Summer Universiade
Left-handed fencers
21st-century Chinese women